Histoire de Melody Nelson is a 1971 concept album by French songwriter Serge Gainsbourg. Produced by Jean-Claude Desmarty, the album was released on March 24, 1971 through Philips Records. Its narrative follows an illicit romance which develops between the middle-aged narrator and 15-year-old girl Melody Nelson. 

Histoire de Melody Nelson is considered by many critics and fans to be Gainsbourg's most influential and accomplished work, as well as one of the greatest French-language albums in popular music.

Concept
At just under twenty-eight minutes, the short running time and the stylistic consistency and similarity throughout the album give it qualities more in line with an EP or an extended musical piece with a number of movements. Histoire de Melody Nelson‘s mix of freewheeling guitar, funk style bass guitar, near spoken word vocal delivery, and lush, deep orchestrated string and choral arrangements by Jean-Claude Vannier, who composed almost the entire music in collaboration with Gainsbourg for the album, have proven to be highly influential amongst later francophone and anglophone musical performers.

The cover photograph was shot by Tony Frank. In it, Melody is portrayed by Gainsbourg's partner, Jane Birkin, wearing a red wig, and with her jeans rolled down slightly to accommodate her early stage of pregnancy.

Release
After the release of the album, a music video was made for each song and released all together as Melody, a short musical.

On October 18, 2011, Mercury Records through Universal Music released the album with a second CD containing alternate takes of all seven tracks as well as instrumental and vocal versions of the excised track "Melody Lit Babar". A limited edition was also released that included a DVD which featured the original album remixed in Dolby Digital 5.1 surround sound and a 40-minute documentary on the making of the album which includes interviews with Jane Birkin, Jean-Claude Vannier, and others. This release also includes a full-color booklet of liner notes in both French and English.

Critical reception

Upon its release in 1971, Histoire de Melody Nelson received critical acclaim and praise. At Metacritic, which assigns a normalized rating out of 100 to reviews from critics, the album received an average score of 96, which indicates "universal acclaim", based on 9 reviews. Jason Ankeny of AllMusic described the album as "arguably his [Gainsbourg's] most coherent and perfectly realized studio album" and stated "It's by turns fascinating and repellent, hilarious and grim, but never dull -- which, in Gainsbourg's world, would be the ultimate (and quite possibly the only) sin." Keith Phipps of The A.V. Club wrote "It’s a true album—its tale of innocence lost and unearned last chances wouldn’t work as well in any other medium." Tom Ewing of Pitchfork stated, "The bookend tracks of Melody Nelson are a trip through far more hostile territories, the black spaces of a man's interior." He also praised the "originality" of the record, describing its sound as similar to "nothing else in rock." D.M. Edwards of PopMatters commented "This is genre-defying music, but anyone with an interest in hearing a blueprint for trip hop or a master class in the depiction of desire in pop music, should be sure to listen to this mysterious, timeless, contradictory album."

Accolades
{|class="wikitable sortable"
|-
! Publication
! Country
! Accolade
! Year
! Rank
|-
| Pitchfork
| align="center"| US
| Top 100 Albums of the 1970s
| align="center"| 2004
| align="center"| 21
|-
| Rolling Stone France
| align="center"| France
| The 100 Greatest French Rock Albums
| align="center"| 2010
| align="center"| 4
|-
|}

Legacy
Histoire de Melody Nelson is regarded by many critics and fans to be Gainsbourg's magnum opus and his most influential release. While it became a pivotal album of the 1970s and was instrumental in the development of French rock music and trip hop genre, it has also influenced many musical artists outside France, including Jarvis Cocker of Pulp, Beck, Tricky, Broadcast, Barry Adamson of Magazine, David Holmes, Cibo Matto, Neil Hannon of The Divine Comedy, Stereolab, Michael Stipe of R.E.M., Portishead, The Last Shadow Puppets and Arctic Monkeys. Portishead based its musical style on the album's mixture of orchestrations with dusty drums, while Beck utilized the album's main theme heavily on his song "Paper Tiger", on his 2002 album, Sea Change. French electronic music act Air was also influenced by the album. Faith No More and Mr. Bungle vocalist Mike Patton also expressed his appreciation for the album and Gainsbourg's music, stating that "he was immediately awe-struck by the elegance, variety and detail of Serge's 'pop' forms". "It made me think that I had a lot to learn".

The songs on Histoire de Melody Nelson were covered and sampled by various artists of different genres. British rock band Placebo recorded a cover version of "The Ballad of Melody Nelson", which was released on a compilation of cover versions with their Sleeping with Ghosts album. Portishead also covered the song in French, collaborating with Jane Birkin. Mick Harvey of Nick Cave and the Bad Seeds also released a total of four Gainsbourg tribute albums, two in the 1990s, Intoxicated Man (1995) and Pink Elephants (1997), and two more nearly 20 years later, Delirium Tremens (2016) and Intoxicated Women (2017). He also joined the stage with frequent collaborator PJ Harvey in 1996 for performances of two Gainsbourg songs, "Bonnie and Clyde" and "Harley Davidson". Michael Stipe covered "L'hôtel particulier" under the name "L'Hotel" on a 2006 Gainsbourg tribute album, Monsieur Gainsbourg Revisited. Hip hop act De La Soul sampled "Ah! Melody" on their song, "Held Down" from AOI: Bionix (2001); and Portishead's remix of Massive Attack's 1995 song "Karmacoma" sampled the bassline of "Melody". Mirwais, a French producer who is known for his work for Madonna, sampled "Cargo Culte" on his album Production (2000). David Holmes used a sample of "Melody" on his track "Don't Die Just Yet", from his 1997 album Let's Get Killed (1997). Brazilian musician Rogério Skylab covered "Ah! Melody" for his 2009 album Skygirls.

Tributes
Jean-Claude Vannier performed the album live at London's Barbican on October 21, 2006 with guest vocalists Jarvis Cocker, Badly Drawn Boy, Brigitte Fontaine, The Bad Seeds’ Mick Harvey and the lead singer from Super Furry Animals, Gruff Rhys. Vannier performed the album in its entirety alongside his own solo album L'Enfant assassin des mouches. Publicity for the Barbican concert revealed that the musicians used for the album were Dougie Wright, Big Jim Sullivan, Herbie Flowers and Vic Flick who all joined Vannier for the concert. The BBC Concert Orchestra, the Crouch End Festival Chorus and a children’s string quintet were also part of the show.

On 22 and 23 October 2008, Jean-Claude Vannier performed the album live at the Cité de la Musique with guest vocalists Mathieu Amalric, Brigitte Fontaine, Brian Molko, Martina Topley-Bird, Daniel Darc, Clotilde Hesme, and Seaming To. Also performing were Herbie Flowers (bass), Claude Engel (guitar) and Pierre-Alain Dahan (drums). Vannier also performed his album L'Enfant Assassin Des Mouches. The Lamoureux Orchestra, the Yound Choir of Paris and a children's string quintet were also part of the show.

On 28 August 2011, Vannier participated in A Tribute to Serge Gainsbourg at the Hollywood Bowl in Hollywood, California. The artists that performed Gainsbourg's songs that evening included Beck, Sean Lennon and Charlotte Kemp Muhl, Mike Patton, Zola Jesus, Victoria Legrand (singer of indie band Beach House), Ed Droste (singer of indie band Grizzly Bear) and Serge's son Lulu Gainsbourg. The second half of the evening included a performance of the album with Vannier conducting. Each of the album's songs were performed by different combinations of the evening's artists, backed by the Hollywood Bowl Orchestra and the Cal State Fullerton chorale. American actor Joseph Gordon-Levitt also participated in the album's performance.

Track listing

Personnel
Album personnel:

 Serge Gainsbourg – vocals, piano, guitar
 Alan Parker – guitar
 Vic Flick – lead guitar
 Big Jim Sullivan – rhythm guitar
 Dave Richmond – bass guitar
 Roger Coulam – keyboards
 Jean-Claude Vannier – arrangement, orchestra direction
 Jane Birkin – vocals
 Dougie Wright – drums
 Jean-Luc Ponty – electric violin (on "En Melody")
 Jean-Claude Charvier – recording
 Jean-Claude Desmarty – production

Charts

References

External links
 
 
 

1971 albums
Serge Gainsbourg albums
Philips Records albums
French-language albums
Concept albums
Albums conducted by Jean-Claude Vannier
Albums arranged by Jean-Claude Vannier